Walter Sorrells is an American author of mystery and suspense novels for adults and teens, who also writes under the pseudonyms Lynn Abercrombie and Ruth Birmingham. He also hand-forges swords and knives in the Japanese style.

Sorrells has written many novels, including Fake I.D., named one of the ten Best Mysteries by Booklist magazine in 2005 and several novels based-on the television series Flight 29 Down. 

His novel Fulton County Blues, as Ruth Birmingham, won the 2000 Edgar Allan Poe Award for Best Paperback Original.

Personal life 
Sorrells was born in 1962 in Nashville, Tennessee.  He graduated from Haverford College in 1985, where he majored in history. 

He is married to Patti Sorrells, and the couple have a son, Jake. They live in Atlanta.

Sorrells holds a third-degree black belt in Japanese Shito-ryu karate and has studied Brazilian jiujitsu, aikido, and Tai Chi. He has also studied Okinawan kobudō, the weapon systems of Okinawan martial arts, as well as the Japanese sword arts of Iaido and Shinkendo.

Additionally, Sorrells is a competitive pistol shooter.

Career 
Sorrells began writing novels in his mid-twenties and published his first novel, Power of Attorney, in 1994.

Aside from writing, Sorrells handcrafts elaborate knives and swords. He began "making blades as research for a character: “The novel died, but the pursuit lived,” he stated.

Awards and honors

Publications

Cold Case Thriller series (as Lynn Abercrombie) 
 The Body Box (2005)
 Blind Fear (2006)

Flight 29 Down series (as Walter Sorrells) 

 Ten Rules adaption, created by D.J. MacHale and Stan Rogow (2006)

 Static adaption, created by D.J. MacHale and Stan Rogow (2006)
 Scratch adaption, created by D.J. MacHale and Stan Rogow (2006)
 On Fire adaption, created by D.J. MacHale and Stan Rogow (2007)
 Survival adaption, created by D.J. MacHale and Stan Rogow (2007)

Pendragon: Before the War series (as Walter Sorrells) 

 The Travelers: Book Two (2009)
 The Travelers: Book Three, with D. J. MacHale (2009)

Hunted series (as Walter Sorrells) 

 Fake ID (2005)
 Club Dread (2006)
 Whiteout (2009)

Standalone novels (as Walter Sorrells) 

 Power of Attorney (1994)
 Cry for Justice (1996)
 Will to Murder (1996)
 The Silent Room (2006)
 First Shot (2007)
 Erratum (2008)

Sunny Childs Mystery series (as Ruth Birmingham 
 Atlanta Graves (1998)
 Fulton County Blues (1999)
 Sweet Georgia (2000)
 Blue Plate Special (2001)
 Cold Trail (2002)
 Feet of Clay (2006)

See also 
 Walter Sorrells's Official Author's Website
 Walter Sorrells's Official Swordsmith Website

References 

Living people
Edgar Award winners
1962 births
Pseudonymous writers

Haverford College alumni
20th-century American writers
21st-century American writers
Writers from Nashville, Tennessee
Writers from Atlanta